The Dikrong River is a sub-tributary of the Brahmaputra River in the Indian state of Assam. The Dikrong river originates in the hills of Arunachal Pradesh and flows through major cities like Nirjuli in Arunachal Pradesh and Bihpuria in Assam before its confluence with the Subansiri River.

History
Description of the Dikrong river is found in early religious book Kalika Purana, where the river was mentioned as Dikkar Basini.

Tributaries of Dikrong
Left bank tributaries of hill areas:
 Keyate Nadi  
 Pang Nadi (Nadi means river in Assamese language) 
 Shu Pabung  
 Peti Nalla 
Right bank tributaries of hill areas:
 Ranchi Pabung  
 Pachin Nadi 
Left bank tributaries of plain areas:
 Beguli Nadi 
Right bank tributaries of plain areas:
 Kachikata Nadi

References 

Rivers of Assam
Rivers of India